Ben Hindle (born May 23, 1974 in Calgary, Alberta) is a Canadian bobsledder who competed in the 1990s. Hindle won a bronze medal in the four-man event at the 1999 FIBT World Championships in Cortina d'Ampezzo.

Competing in two Winter Olympics, he finished 11th in the four-man event at Nagano in 1998.

Prior to his career in bobsleigh, Hindle also competed in track and field, ranking nationally in the 100 m and 200 m events.

Hindle also appeared as a Russian bobsledder in the 1993 film Cool Runnings.

References
Bobsleigh four-man world championship medalists since 1930
Canoe.ca 2002 profile

1974 births
Living people
Athletes from Calgary
Bobsledders at the 1998 Winter Olympics
Bobsledders at the 2002 Winter Olympics
Canadian male bobsledders
Canadian male sprinters
Olympic bobsledders of Canada